Melvyn Maile Tom (August 4, 1941 – April 27, 2006) was an American football defensive lineman who played nine seasons in the National Football League (NFL) for the Philadelphia Eagles and the Chicago Bears.  Mel is the father of Landon Tom and Logan Tom, member of the 2000, 2004, 2008 and 2012 American Olympic indoor volleyball teams.  He died at age 64 of heart failure.

References

1941 births
2006 deaths
Native Hawaiian sportspeople
American football defensive linemen
San Jose State Spartans football players
Hawaii Rainbow Warriors football players
Philadelphia Eagles players
Chicago Bears players
American sportspeople of Chinese descent
Hawaii people of Chinese descent
Players of American football from Honolulu